Lagira Zhala Ji is an Indian Marathi television drama. It premiered on 1 May 2017 and stopped on 22 June 2019. It was produced by Shweta Shinde for Vajra Productions.

Plot 
It is the story of an orphaned Ajinkya Shinde belonging to a small village near Satara. He is a dedicated follower of Maratha king Shivaji and dreams of joining the Indian Army and serving the nation, for which he is preparing himself to achieve. Ajinkya has already lost his parents in a mine explosion and live with his maternal uncle, aunt, grandma and cousin sister. Since he lost his parents in an explosion, he wants to be in the army and fight against the terrorists. If needed, then he is even ready to sacrifice his own life for his country. That is his ideology. Sheetal is Ajinkya's love interest. Ajinkya and Sheetal, in spite of sparkling chemistry between themselves, can't stand each other's presence. But slowly they fall in love.
Later on, Sheetal's family arranges her marriage with Harshvardhan Deshmukh, who turns out to be an illegal arms businessman. On the other side, Ajinkya gets chance in army training. Ajinkya works with the army to capture Harshvardhan and succeeds. Ajinkya marries Sheetal under the situation.

Cast

Main 
 Shivani Baokar as Sheetal Surendra Pawar / Sheetal Ajinkya Shinde
 Nitish Chavan as Fauji Ajinkya Shinde (Ajya)

Recurring 
Bhoite family
 Kiran Dhane as Jayshree Samadhan Bhoite / Jayshree Harshvardhan Deshmukh (Jaydi) 
 Purva Shinde replacing Kiran as Jayshree (Jaydi)
 Vidya Sawale as Pushpa Samadhan Bhoite (Mami) 
 Kalyani Chaudhari replacing Vidya as Pushpa 
 Santosh Patil as Samadhan Bhoite (Mama)
 Kamal Thoke as Jiji

Pawar family
 Manjusha Khetri as Neelam Appa Pawar
 Daya Eksambekar as Usha Surendra Pawar
 Saurabh Bhise as Saurabh Surendra Pawar
 Devendra Deo as Surendra Pawar (Nana)
 Sandip Jangam as Jitendra Pawar
 Shivani Ghatge as Suman Jitendra Pawar
 Dhruv Gosavi as Dhruv Jitendra Pawar
 Dhondiram Karande as Appa

Deshmukh family
 Kiran Gaikwad as Harshvardhan Yuvaraj Deshmukh (Bhaiyyasaheb)
 Yogini Pophale as Pratibha Yuvaraj Deshmukh (Taisaheb)
 Bharati Dole as Aaisaheb
 Vedraj Anapat as Simba
 Mahesh Jadhav as Talent

Fauji
 Nikhil Chavan as Vikram Raut (Vikya)
 Vikram Gaikwad aa Dheeraj Nikam
 Mahesh Ghag as Hanumant
 Shriram Lokhande as Abhay Marane
 Aniket Lad as Pashya
 Varinder Singh as Sardarji
 Amit Kulkarni as K.K.
 Arjun Kusumbe as Shailesh
 Sumeet Pusavale as Sumit
 Rahul Jagtap as Rahul

Villagers
 Amarnath Kharade as Jameer (Jamya)
 Laxmi Vibhute as Yasmin
 Rahul Magdum as Rahul Ravindra Tate
 Nilima Kamane as Nilima Ravindra Tate
 Shekhar Sawant as Photographer
 Kiran Dalavi as Gotya
 Sachin Hagavane-Patil as Milk Dairy owner
 Rukmini Sutar as Aaji

Reception 
It premiered from 1 May 2017 on Maharashtra Day and aired on Zee Marathi by replacing Jai Malhar.

Special episode (1 hour) 
 22 July 2018
 2 September 2018
 6 January 2019

Ratings

Adaptations

Awards

References

External links 
 Lagira Zhala Ji at ZEE5
 

Marathi-language television shows
Zee Marathi original programming
2019 Indian television series endings
2017 Indian television series debuts